JSY may refer to:
 Janani Suraksha Yojana, an Indian health programme
 Jersey
 Joseph State Airport, in Oregon, United States
 Just Say Yes (disambiguation)
 Syros Island National Airport, in Greece